is an action video game developed by Dearfield and published by Jorudan for the Wii console, exclusively available in Japan.

This is also the last known video game to be developed by Jorudan.

Gameplay
In the game, Rena is a cat who is the mascot of a blog named "Nekopunch" and the CEO of a fictional company named Cat Queen, Inc. It is the player's objective to appease Rena in order to be accepted as her employee.

Sukeban Shachou Rena's gameplay involves several minigames where the player takes control of a cat or in other minigames, humans. Minigame examples include playing the piano, dodging pouncing cats, taking money from a cat while it is not looking, and dancing to appease Rena, using the Wii Remote.  Some of the minigames also make use of the Nunchuk.

Reception
The game was a commercial and critical failure. In its first week of its release, Sukeban Shachou Rena had sold only approximately 100 copies. 
Famitsu awarded the game a score of 22 out of 40 (5/6/6/5).. Critics praised the humor of the story, but criticized the lack of content and the quality of the minigames.

References

External links
 
Nekopunch blog 

2009 video games
Action video games
Fictional cats
Japan-exclusive video games
Minigame compilations
Video games about cats
Video games developed in Japan
Wii games
Wii-only games